Lautaro Volcano is an active subglacial stratovolcano located in Chilean Patagonia, in the northern part of the Southern Patagonian Ice Field. It is the tallest mountain in Bernardo O'Higgins National Park and in its vicinity lies Pío XI Glacier. In 1952 the volcano was given its name in honor of Lautaro, who was a Mapuche military leader.

The first ascent of Lautaro was made by Peter Skvarca and Luciano Pera, on January 29, 1964. They climbed the southeast ridge, encountering many crevasses, some steep ice walls, cornices, and a snow mushroom at the summit. They found an active crater and strong sulfurous emissions near the summit. The second ascent was made by Eric Jones, Mick Coffey, and Leo Dickinson on March 2, 1973, as part of a crossing of the Southern Patagonian Ice Field.

See also
 List of volcanoes in Chile
 List of Ultras of South America

References 

 

Lautaro
Volcanoes of Aysén Region
Lautaro
Andean Volcanic Belt
Lautaro
Quaternary volcanoes
Quaternary South America
Three-thousanders of the Andes